Sir Richard Bligh St George, 2nd Baronet (1765 – 1851) was an Anglo-Irish politician.

He was the eldest son of Sir Richard St George, 1st Baronet and Sarah Persse, daughter of Robert Persse of Roxborough House, County Galway, and in 1789 he inherited his father's baronetcy. Between 1789 and 1800 St George represented Athlone in the Irish House of Commons.

He married firstly Harriet Kelly, daughter of Mr Justice Thomas Kelly of the Court of Common Pleas (Ireland) and Frances Hickie. He married secondly Bridget Blakeney, daughter of Captain Theophilus Blakeney and Margaret Stafford. By two wives he had twelve children, including Theophilus, his eldest son and heir, and Grace, who married Charles Caulfield, briefly Bishop of Nassau and the Bahamas. He lived at Wooodsgift, County Kilkenny, which had been granted to his great-grandfather in 1666.

References

1765 births
1851 deaths
18th-century Anglo-Irish people
Irish MPs 1783–1790
Irish MPs 1790–1797
Irish MPs 1798–1800
Baronets in the Baronetage of Ireland
Members of the Parliament of Ireland (pre-1801) for County Westmeath constituencies